The Horse That Bud Bought is the fourth studio album from heavy metal band Galactic Cowboys.  The album title comes from the lyrics to the song "Oregon". The song is derived from real life events where bassist Monty Colvin and his family (mother and father) sold all of their worldly goods and joined a cult that lived in a commune up in the mountains of Oregon. The cult leader was upset that Monty's father had bought him a horse and told him he had to give it to the whole "family".

Notes
 The cover art was painted by bassist Monty Colvin.
 The song "Tilt-A-Whirl" contains a recorded sample of an actual Tilt-a-whirl carnival ride.
 The outro to the song "My Life" contains lyrics from the band's song "Still Life of Peace" sung to the tune of The Beatles' "Blue Jay Way".
The Japanese version of this album contained the bonus track "Every Knee".
 The title to the song "The Buzz" comes from the nickname of an old rock station in Houston

Track listing

Personnel
Ben Huggins – Vocals, guitar
Wally Farkas – Guitar, vocals, keys
Monty Colvin – Bass, vocals 
Alan Doss – Drums, vocals, keys

References

External links
The Horse That Bud Bought lyrics

1997 albums
Galactic Cowboys albums